Kazimierz Lis (9 April 1910 – 15 July 1998) was a football player of the Polish team Warta Poznań as well as Polish International Team. He played in the 1930s and late 1940s, back then Warta was one of top teams of Poland (in 1935 it was third overall, in 1938 - second). Also, Lis was a member of the reserve team of Poland in the 1938 World Cup in France (he did not go to the tournament and stayed at home). Lis also played in Warta after World War II, in 1947 he was member of the team that won Championships of Poland.

References 

1910 births
1998 deaths
Polish footballers
1938 FIFA World Cup players
Warta Poznań players
Footballers from Poznań
Association football midfielders